Gracias!... América... Sin Fronteras (Thank You America, Without Borders) is a studio album released by Regional Mexican band Los Tigres del Norte. It was released on December 27, 1986 by Fonovisa Records. The album became their third number-one set in the Billboard Regional Mexican Albums chart and earned the Grammy Award for Best Mexican-American Performance at the 30th Grammy Awards.

Track listing
América – 3:02
Sin Fronteras – 2:40
La Puerta Negra – 3:26
Flores de Mi País – 3:09
Paso a Paso – 2:10
El Dorado – 3:50
Los Hijos de Hernández – 3:53
Popurri Mexicano: México Lindo/Yo Soy Mexicano/Como México No Hay Dos – 3:54
Ay, Ay, Hay... – 2:53
El Macho y el Hombre – 2:39
Amigo Querido – 3:11
Mi Distrito Federal – 3:02

Chart performance

See also
 List of number-one Billboard Regional Mexican Albums from the 1980s

References

1986 albums
Los Tigres del Norte albums
Spanish-language albums
Fonovisa Records albums
Grammy Award for Best Mexican/Mexican-American Album